Attack Force may refer to:

Attack Force (film), a 2006 action/thriller film, starring Steven Seagal
Attack Force Z, a 1982 Australian World War II film, directed by Tim Burstall
Attack Force (microgame), a 1982 board game from TSR
Attack Force (video game), a 1980 computer game developed by Big Five Software